Redbeard  or Red Beard may refer to:

People
 Frederick Barbarossa (Redbeard), another name for Frederick I, Holy Roman Emperor (1122–1190)
 Oruç Reis or Redbeard (Barbarossa) (1474–1518), Ottoman naval commander
 Hayreddin Barbarossa or Red Beard (1478–1546), privateer and Ottoman admiral
 Ragnar Redbeard, pseudonymous author of 1896 book Might is Right
 Redbeard, former DJ at Q102 in Dallas, Texas and host of In the Studio

Other uses
 Red Beard (nuclear weapon), a British tactical nuclear weapon
 Red Beard, a 1965 Japanese film directed by Akira Kurosawa
 Redbeard (comics), a series of Belgian comic books
 Redbeard, a common epithet of  Thor, a major god in Norse mythology
Redbeard, the nickname for Victor Trevor, a childhood friend of Sherlock Holmes's, from the BBC television show Sherlock
 Redbeard (card game), the Swedish card game of Rödskägg.

See also
Barbarossa (disambiguation)
Bluebeard (disambiguation)
Blackbeard (disambiguation)